The Occupy Wall Street protests, which started in 2011, inspired a wide international response. There have been hundreds of Occupy movement protests worldwide over time, intended and organized as non-violent protest against the wealthy, as well as banking institutions. Months before the Occupy movement began, the Movimiento 15-M planned to hold events in many nations on October 15, 2011.  The Occupy movement joined in and also held many events in many nations on that day. A list of proposed events for the 15 October 2011 global protests listed events in 951 cities in 82 countries. Protest camps were built at many of the protest locations, often near banking institutions or stock markets. Many locations had further manifestations at the following weekends until "Guy-Fawkes" day since the Guy Fawkes mask had become protester fashion. Many American Occupy groups were active until 2012, some are still active.

On the one-year anniversary of the Occupy Movement (September 17, 2012), The Guardian published the "Occupy Directory"'s "map of the Occupy world".

Africa

America

Canada

Latin America

United States

Asia

Europe

Oceania

See also 

 List of Occupy movement topics
 Timeline of Occupy Wall Street
 We are the 99%

Other U.S. protests

 2011 United States public employee protests
 2011 Wisconsin protests

Other international protests

 15 October 2011 global protests
 2010–2011 Greek protests
 2011 Chilean protests
 2011 Israeli social justice protests
 2011 United Kingdom anti-austerity protests and 2010 UK student protests
 2010 student protest in Dublin
 Iceland Kitchenware Revolution
 Spanish 15M Indignants movement

Related articles

 Bank Transfer Day
 Corruption Perceptions Index
 Economic inequality
 Grassroots movement
 Impact of the Arab Spring
 Income inequality in the United States
 List of countries by distribution of wealth
 List of countries by income equality
 Plutocracy
 Wealth inequality in the United States

References

External links
Occupy Directory  - a public listing of all known geographically-based Occupations. The Occupy Directory was built by and for the #Occupy movement as a sub-project of the Federated General Assembly (FGA). On the one-year anniversary of the Occupy Movement, the Guardian published the Directory's map as a "The map of the Occupy world."  
Occupy Together | Home.

Protest locations
Occupy Wall Street
Occupy movement protest locations
Occupy movement protest locations